Polidori is an Italian surname. Polidori may refer to:

People
Alessandro Polidori (born 1992), Italian footballer
Ambra Polidori (born 1954), Mexican artist
Enzo Polidori (1936–2021), Italian politician
Erika Polidori (born 1992), Canadian softball player
Frances Polidori (1800–1886), daughter of Gaetano, mother of Maria, Dante, William and Christina Rossetti
Gaetano Polidori (1763–1853), Italian writer
Giancarlo Polidori (born 1943), Italian cyclist
Gianni Polidori (1923–1992), Italian art director
Gino Polidori (1941–2014), American politician
John William Polidori (1795–1821), Italian-English physician and writer, son of Gaetano
Paolo Polidori (1778–1847), Italian cardinal
Robert Polidori (born 1951), Canadian photographer 
Victor Polidori (1888–1931), French gymnast

Other
 Polidori Sausage, a food company
 Polidori RLA, a historical name for the now defunct Air Estates Airport

See also
 Polydore (disambiguation)

Italian-language surnames